Sphinx was a two-deck 64 gun ship of the French Navy. She was built at Brest to plans by Ollivier Fils and launched in 1776. She took the name of a recently retired 64-gun ship with the same dimensions. She fought in the American War of Independence, most notably in Suffren's campaign in the Indian Ocean.

Features 

She was built according to norms laid down by French shipbuilders in the 1730s and 1740s which had aimed at a good combination of low cost and high manoeuvrability and armament, in the face of a numerically-superior British Royal Navy. The first 64-gun ship of her type was launched in 1735, followed by dozens of others until the end of the 1770s, a decade in which they were definitively outclassed by 74-gun ships.

As with all French warships of this era, she had an oak hull, pine masts and hemp ropes and sails. She not only carried fewer guns than a 74-gun ship, her 64 iron guns were of lower caliber:
Twenty-six 24-pounder guns on one gun deck
Twenty-eight 12-pounder guns on her other gun deck
Ten six-pounder guns on her forecastle and aftcastle
Each gun had a reserve of around 50 to 60 shot as well as bar shot and grape shot.

She could also carry enough fresh water to feed her crew for two to three months and enough provisions to feed them for five to six months without calling at a port. This included wine, vinegar, oil, flour, condiments, cheese, fruits, dry vegetables and even livestock which would be butchered on board.

History

American War of Independence (1775–1783) 
Sphinx fought as part of Louis Guillouet d'Orvilliers's fleet against Augustus Keppel's force at the Battle of Ushant on 27 July 1778, captained by comte de Soulanges. She formed part of the Blue Squadron, the rear guard commanded by Louis-Philippe d'Orléans, duc de Chartres.

In 1780 she joined Guichen's squadron sent to fight in the Antilles. On 17 April 1780, still captained by the comte de Soulanges, she fought in the Battle of Martinique in the West Indies. She and the rest of the squadron then returned to France.

In 1781 she joined Suffren's small force, sent to fight in the Indian Ocean. On 16 April she fought in the French victory at the Battle of Porto Praya. Afterwards she took the badly-damaged  in tow. She was then stationed off the Cape of Good Hope for a few weeks to take on board reinforcements heading for Mauritius Island.

Between 1782 and 20 June 1783, Sphinx was an engaged in Suffren's five battles in the Bay of Bengal and off Sri Lanka - the battles of Sadras (17 February 1782), Providien (12 April 1782), Negapatam (6 July 1782), Trincomalee (August and September 1782) and Cuddalore (20 June 1783).

At the Battle of Providien, Sphinx, under Captain du Chilleau, was fourth in the French line, behind  Petit Annibal (Captain de Morard de Galles). She came within pistol range of his opposite number,  (Captain Peter Rainier) before opening fire. She sustained casualties, with over 20 killed, including Lieutenant Anerchiesna and Lieutenant de Bourdeille, and about 75 wounded, including Ensign d'Aigremont.

During this campaign she captured the troop transport Raikes on 6 June 1782 and  three days later. She also took  in tow after the latter was dismasted at the Battle of Trincomalee.

After the war, Sphinx sailed to Isle de France for a refit. Her captain, Du Chilleau, claimed that the cannonballs removed from her hull filled six longboats.

Final years
She returned to France for a refit in 1784 and was then posted to the Rochefort squadron. She was barely ten years old but had already been outclassed - the American War of Independence had shown that she and her type were not powerful enough and the naval ministry had already begun to prioritise building 74-gun ships, a drive that came to its final fruition with the designs of Borda and Sané. When war broke out with Britain again in 1793, Sphinx was turned into a floating battery with twelve 36-pounder guns, four-16-pounder howitzers, six swivel guns, and two mortars. Sphinx is also recorded as a hulk in Rochefort in 1793 and disappeared from the navy lists in 1802.

References

Bibliography

  (notice BnF no FRBNF36697883)
 
  (notice BnF no FRBNF35734655)
  et  (notice BnF no FRBNF38825325)

Further reading

  (notice BnF no FRBNF42480097)
  (notice BnF no FRBNF37219533)
  (notice BnF no FRBNF44313515)
  (notice BnF no FRBNF35864311)
Rémi Monaque, Une histoire de la marine de guerre française, Paris, éditions Perrin, 2016, 526 p.
Rémi Monaque, Suffren, Tallandier, 2009, p. 53-57
Jean-Michel Roche, Dictionnaire des bâtiments de la flotte de guerre française de Colbert à nos jours, t. 1, de 1671 à 1870, Toulon, J.-M. Roche, 2005, 527 p. (OCLC 165892922, notice BnF no FRBNF40090770
Alain Demerliac, La Marine de Louis XVI : nomenclature des navires français de 1774 à 1792, Nice, Omega, 1996, 238 p..
Onésime Troude, Batailles navales de la France, t. 2, Paris, Challamel aîné, 1867, 469 p. (lire en ligne [archive])
Georges Lacour-Gayet, La Marine militaire de la France sous le règne de Louis XV, Paris, Honoré Champion éditeur, édition revue et augmentée en 1910 (1re éd. 1902), 581 p. (notice BnF no FRBNF37450961)
Georges Lacour-Gayet, La marine militaire de France sous le règne de Louis XVI, Paris, éditions Honoré Champion, 1905, 719 p. (notice BnF no FRBNF30709972)

External links
 French Third Rate ship of the line Le Sphinx (1775) - Three Decks - Warships in the Age of Sail 
  Vaisseaux de ligne français de 1682 à 1780, list by Ronald Deschênes on agh

Ships of the line of the French Navy
1776 ships